South Riding is a 1938 British drama film directed by Victor Saville and produced by Alexander Korda, starring Edna Best, Ralph Richardson, Edmund Gwenn and Ann Todd. It was the film debut of a 15-year-old Glynis Johns. It is based on the 1936 novel South Riding by Winifred Holtby. The BBC produced a TV adaptation in 2011.

Plot
A squire becomes involved in local politics.

Cast
Edna Best as Sarah Burton
Ralph Richardson as Robert Carne
Edmund Gwenn as Alfred Huggins
Ann Todd as Madge Carne
Marie Lohr as Mrs. Beddows
Milton Rosmer as Alderman Snaith
John Clements as Joe Astell
Edward Lexy as Mr. Holly
Joan Ellum as Lydia Holly
Glynis Johns as Midge Carne (first credited film appearance)
Josephine Wilson as Mrs. Holly
Gus McNaughton as Tadman
Herbert Lomas as Castle
Peggy Novak as Bessie Warbuckle
Lewis Casson as Lord Sedgmire
Felix Aylmer as Chairman of Council
Jean Cadell as Miss Dry
Skelton Knaggs as Reginald Aythorne

Critical reception
TV Guide wrote, "Not an altogether satisfying love story, it is more interesting as a portrait of pre-WW II life in the country. Excellent sets by Meerson and well shot by Stradling"; while Time Out wrote, "Saville carries Winifred Holtby's tart, witty exposé of Yorkshire power politics to the screen with breathtaking, and totally unexpected, panache." Leonard Maltin called it "Smoothly made and superbly acted by a flawless cast."

References

External links

1938 films
British drama films
1938 drama films
Films directed by Victor Saville
Films set in Yorkshire
Films based on British novels
Films produced by Alexander Korda
Films scored by Richard Addinsell
British black-and-white films
Films produced by Victor Saville
1930s British films